Benjamin Pedersen (born May 11, 1999) is a Danish-American race car driver from Copenhagen, with residence in Seattle, Washington. He currently competes in IndyCar driving for A.J. Foyt Enterprises.

Early career

Lower formulae 
Pedersen began his single-seater career in 2016, driving for Leading Edge Grand Prix in cooperation with Global Racing Group, a team set up by his father, in the F4 United States Championship. A strong start with a podium at Mid-Ohio proved deceiving, as Pedersen ended up tenth in the drivers' standings.

For the 2017 season, Pedersen remained in the F4 US series, now partnering Justin Sirgany and Jacob Loomis at Global Racing Group. This season yielded more success, as the Dane took podiums in the first two events, before ending the campaign on a particularly impressive note, winning twice in the penultimate round and once more at the season finale, held as part of the 2017 United States Grand Prix weekend. These results led to Pedersen finishing fourth overall, beating both of his teammates.

In 2018, the Dane returned to tackle the F4 US Championship for the final time, where he took two victories, placing fifth in the standings.

Formula Regional & BRDC F3 
Parallel to his F4 campaign, Pedersen competed in the inaugural season of the F3 Americas Championship. Despite missing two events, Pedersen finished third overall, being beaten by fellow GRG driver Baltazar Leguizamón.

2019 saw Pedersen performing double-duties in the F3 Americas and BRDC F3 championships, the latter becoming his first venture into European racing. In the former, Pedersen won seven races, which included a triple of victories at Sebring, which put him second in the standings. Over in British F3, a victory in the reverse-grid race at Silverstone, coupled with a further podium in Snetterton, left the Dane 14th overall.

A full season of the BRDC British F3 Championship was on the cards for Pedersen in 2020, driving for Double R Racing. He ended the season ninth in the drivers' standings, having taken three podiums including another win in Silvestone.

Indy Lights

2021 
Pedersen switched to the Road to Indy ladder for 2021, driving for Global Racing Group in Indy Lights. The season began with a second place at Barber, although he would fail to take any podiums throughout the following three rounds. The Dane, who by this stage was racing under an American licence, bounced back with a podium appearance at Road America before going on to experience a strong second half of the campaign, with four third-placed finishes elevating him to fourth overall.

2022 
In 2022, Pedersen returned to Indy Lights for his sophomore season. Having scored five podiums, which contained his first win in the category at Portland, Pedersen took fifth in the championship.

IndyCar Series 
Having tested for Juncos Hollinger Racing at the end of June, it was announced that Pedersen would be entering the IndyCar Series in 2023, driving for the A.J. Foyt Enterprises outfit alongside Santino Ferrucci.

Racing record

Career summary

* Season still in progress.

Complete Formula 4 United States Championship results
(key) (Races in bold indicate pole position) (Races in italics indicate fastest lap)

Complete BRDC British Formula 3 Championship results
(key) (Races in bold indicate pole position) (Races in italics indicate fastest lap)

American open-wheel racing results 
(key)

Indy Lights
(key) (Races in bold indicate pole position) (Races in italics indicate fastest lap) (Races with L indicate a race lap led) (Races with * indicate most race laps led)

IndyCar Series
(key) (Races in bold indicate pole position; races in italics indicate fastest lap)

References

External links
  

1999 births
Living people
Danish racing drivers
American racing drivers
Racing drivers from Seattle
BRDC British Formula 3 Championship drivers
Euroformula Open Championship drivers
Sportspeople from Copenhagen
Formula Regional Americas Championship drivers
Indy Lights drivers
IndyCar Series drivers
Double R Racing drivers
United States F4 Championship drivers
HMD Motorsports drivers
A. J. Foyt Enterprises drivers